HMAV can refer to:
 Mildef Tarantula HMAV, Malaysian MRAP

Nautical
HMAV is a ship prefix used for certain British military ships. It can stand for:

 His (or Her) Majesty's Army Vessel, the current meaning
 His (or Her) Majesty's Armed Vessel, prior to the 20th Century